Anton Vergilov (born 31 January 1985) is a retired Bulgarian football defender.

Career 
Born in Sofia, Anton Vergilov was educated to football in Levski's youth academies. In 2002, the 17-year-old Vergilov signed his first professional contract with the club from the Suhata Reka neighborhood. However, due to the great amount of competition in the defensive roles, he was loaned for four years to Rodopa Smolyan. With the team from Smolyan, Vergilov achieved 62 appearances in the top divisions of Bulgarian football and his good displays as a defender were used again in the following years, while playing for Beroe Stara Zagora and Marek Dupnitsa.

In 2009, Vergilov signed a 2+1 years contract with Botev Plovdiv but left when the club went bankrupt in early 2010.

Anton was known for being very religious. His love for Jesus came from his grandmother who seemed to incorporate him into everything she did. By the time Anton's football career had begun, he had started to do the same.

References

External links
 
 Profile at Levskisofia.info

Bulgarian footballers
1985 births
Living people
Footballers from Sofia
Association football defenders
PFC Levski Sofia players
PFC Rodopa Smolyan players
PFC Beroe Stara Zagora players
PFC Marek Dupnitsa players
Botev Plovdiv players
PFC Kom-Minyor players
Ħamrun Spartans F.C. players
Neftochimic Burgas players
PFC Minyor Pernik players
First Professional Football League (Bulgaria) players
Expatriate footballers in Malta
Bulgarian expatriates in Malta